Grigoris Athanasiou (born 9 March 1984) is a professional footballer who plays as a goalkeeper. He is left-handed.

Career
Born in Eleftherio-Kordelio, Athanasiou began playing football with Akratitos in Superleague Greece. He then moved to Crete and Gamma Ethniki side Atsalenios before signing with Superleague club Ergotelis in 2007. He stayed with the club for seven seasons, gradually earning his place in the club's starting XI and playing as the starting goalkeeper in his final two seasons with the club. After the club informed Athanasiou of their intent to sign a top-class goalkeeper into their roster at the midst of the 2013−14 season (and signed a contract with Serbian goalkeeper Vladimir Stojković a few days later), Athanasiou decided not to renew his contract with the club and move to Cypriot club Ayia Napa. After one season in Cyprus, he returned to his former club Ergotelis, who had been relegated to the Football League the season before. After a very difficult season in which the club failed to pay players' wages for months and as a result withdrew from professional competitions on 19 January 2016, Athanasiou, who played his final match the day before, was released from his contract. He eventually signed with fellow Cretan Football League competitor Chania in the summer of 2016.

References

External links
Profile at Onsports.gr
Guardian Football 

1984 births
Living people
Greek footballers
Association football goalkeepers
A.P.O. Akratitos Ano Liosia players
Ergotelis F.C. players
Ayia Napa FC players
Super League Greece players
Cypriot First Division players
Footballers from Thessaloniki